Rochester Rhinos will play their sixteenth season in professional soccer and their first in the newly created USL Pro

Current roster

as of April 13, 2011

Staff

 Bob Lilley (2010–present)

Schedule and results

Pre-season

2011 U.S. Open Cup

Regular season

Match results

Attendance

References

Rochester Rhinos
Rochester New York FC seasons
Rochester Rhinos
Rochester Rhinos